EM Strasbourg Business School is a French business school created in 1919 in Strasbourg, Alsace. Since 2000 it is one of the elite grandes écoles in France, ranking in the top 17 business schools in the nation. It is the only French Business School to operate under the umbrella of a traditional University: the University of Strasbourg. This model, inspired by US and other international references, enables the school to benefit from the multidisciplinary academic research conducted at the University of Strasbourg, a strong support from the public sector and solid partnerships with the private sector. The school is the only one in France to be ranked in the Shanghai academic ranking of world Universities through its affiliation with the University of Strasbourg.

Students can focus their studies in banking and finance, entrepreneurship and management, finance, accounting and auditing, supply chain management, management of information systems, and marketing and sales. The school maintains a large undergraduate and graduate exchange program with nearly 200 partner institutions located in 55 countries all over the world, such as Trinity College, Dublin, Indian Institute of Management Bangalore, and HEC Montréal.

History

In 1919, at the initiative of the Chambre de Commerce et d'Industrie (CCI), the European Institute for Higher Business Studies (IECS) is created.

In 1956, in accordance with the CCI, the IECS is attached to the University of Strasbourg and the French Ministry of Higher Education and Research. The IECS then becomes the only French business schools tied to a traditional University.

In 1999, the IECS moves to a new building, the PEGE (European Center of Management and Economics). The building covers 26,000 m² distributed over four levels.

October 12, 2007 marks a turning point in the History of the school with a strategic merger with the IAE of Strasbourg aimed at forming a new entity: the EM Strasbourg Business School.

The school is the first French public institution to get a 4 years "diversity" label issued by AFNOR in 2012.

In 2015, the School has been accredited AACSB.

In 2022, the Financial Times ranked the Masters in Management program 71st in the world.

Notable alumni
Jean-Marc Zulesi, member of the National Assembly.

References

External links
Official website

Institut d'Administration des Entreprises
University of Strasbourg
Educational institutions established in 1919
Strasbourg
1919 establishments in France